Spinomantis microtis is a species of frog in the Mantellid subfamily Mantellinae, endemic to Madagascar.

Taxonomy
This species was described in the genus Rhacophorus by Guibé in 1974. Glaw and Vences transferred it to Boophis in 1994. Andreone and Randriamahazo transferred it to Mantidactylus in 1997, and finally Glaw and Vences then moved it to Spinomantis in 2006.

Habitat and ecology
Its natural habitats are subtropical or tropical moist lowland forests, subtropical or tropical moist montane forests, and rivers.
It is threatened by habitat loss.

References

Endemic fauna of Madagascar
Amphibians described in 1974
Taxa named by Jean Marius René Guibé
Taxonomy articles created by Polbot